The 2022 Badminton Asia Team Championships (also known as the 2022 Selangor Badminton Asia Team Championship) was held at the Setia City Convention Centre in Shah Alam, Selangor, Malaysia, from 15 to 20 February 2022. This championships was organised by the Badminton Asia with Badminton Association of Malaysia as the host organiser. It was sanctioned by the Badminton World Federation. It served as the Asian qualifiers for the 2022 Thomas & Uber Cup in Thailand. Indonesia, the three-time champions, and Japan were the defending champions of the men's and women's category respectively.

Medalists

Medal table

Squads

Tournament
The 2022 Badminton Asia Team Championships will crown the best male and female national badminton teams in Asia and at the same time serve as the Asian qualification event towards the 2022 Thomas & Uber Cup finals. Due to the COVID-19 pandemic, teams from Chinese Taipei and Thailand withdrew from the tournament.

Venue
This tournament will be held at Setia City Convention Centre in Shah Alam, Selangor, Malaysia.

Seeds
The seeding was based on team ranking on 25 January 2022.
 Men's team
 
 

 
 
 
 
 
 
 
 

 Women's team

Draw
The draw was held on 8 February 2022 at the Selangor State Sports Council in Shah Alam at 1:30pm. Both men's and women's team group stage consist of 2 groups, A and B and Y and Z with 4 teams respectively except for group Y (3 teams).
 Men's team

 Women's team

Men's team

Group stage

Group A

Group B

Knockout stage

Semi-finals

Final

Women's team

Group stage

Group Y

Group Z

Knockout stage

Semi-finals

Final

References

2022 Badminton Asia Team Championships
2022 in badminton
Badminton tournaments in Malaysia
Badminton Asia Team Championships
Badminton Asia Team Championships
Badminton Asia Team Championships